The Time of Your Life is a 1948 American comedy drama film directed by H. C. Potter and starring James Cagney, William Bendix, Wayne Morris and Jeanne Cagney. A Cagney Production, The Time of Your Life was produced by Cagney's brother William and adapted by Nathaniel Curtis from the 1939 William Saroyan play of the same name. Cinematography was by James Wong Howe.

Plot
The film is set, with a few exceptions, entirely at Nick's 'Pacific Street Saloon, Restaurant and Entertainment Palace' in San Francisco, where a sign in the window announces "Come in and be yourself," signed "Nick" (William Bendix).  Joe (James Cagney) sits at one of the saloon's tables much of the time, observing people coming and going.  He is unemployed but apparently well-off, constantly ordering champagne and giving advice or money to others. (It is implied that he has a knack for choosing winning horses at races.)   He desires to live "a civilized life" without hurting anyone and believes the real truth in people is found in their dreams of themselves, not the hard facts of their actual existence.

Joe's best friend and "stooge," Tom (Wayne Morris), believes that he owes his life to Joe and runs peculiar errands for him without any apparent desire to make a life for himself.  Other major characters include Kitty Duval (Jeanne Cagney), a supposed burlesque actress whose real name is Katerina Kornovsky. It is implied that she has actually been a prostitute. Tom is innocently infatuated with her, but he only gets the nerve to ask her out and to pursue his courtship with Joe's urging and help.  One young man, Willie (Richard Erdmann), is a "marble game [pinball machine] maniac."  Another, Dudley Raoul Bostwick (Jimmy Lydon), keeps trying to get up the nerve to call his girlfriend, Elsie Mandelspiegel (Nanette Parks).   At one point, he mistakenly calls a different, older woman (Renie Riano) and asks her to meet him at Nick's but pretends to be someone else when she arrives.  Harry (Paul Draper), a "natural-born tap dancing comedian" who cannot make people laugh, is hired by Nick and dances often during the film.  A young Black man (Reginald Beane) enters looking for any kind of work and is hired to wash dishes, but when he notices Nick's piano, he shows his talent and is amazed that Nick will hire him simply to play.

Among the other characters who come to Nick's, two of the most significant are Freddie Blick (Tom Powers), who extorts money from Nick and later harasses Kitty, and an older man dressed like a cowboy who refers to himself as "Kit Carson" (James Barton).  By the end of the film, Blick's attempt to humiliate and coerce Kitty is foiled by the efforts of Kit Carson, Joe, and Tom; Willie finally wins his game; Dudley and Elsie are reunited; and Joe sends Tom and Kitty off to be married, with Tom now having an independent job as a truck driver.   As Joe and Kit sit down to continue telling each other tall tales, Nick takes his sign advising customers to be themselves and rips it up, proclaiming "Enough is enough!"

Cast

Production
The Cagneys admired the play and acquired its film rights on the condition that theirs not be in release longer than seven years. They gave their director and cinematographer two weeks for blocking, but changed their minds once filming began, spending freely and breaking their budget. The film was shot mostly on one set

The film was shot using Saroyan's original ending where Kit shot and killed Blick offstage, whom the Production Code Administration had forced the producers to change from a police detective into an informer and blackmailer.  The audience heard the shots and saw Kit walk in relating the event as one of his stories "I shot a man once. In San Francisco. Shot him two times...Fellow named Blick or Glick or something. Couldn't stand the way he talked to ladies".

Preview audiences reacted unfavourably. Cagney asked Saroyan to write a more acceptable ending but Saroyan priced his work out of Cagney's reach. A new action-packed climax was substituted with Joe knocking him unconscious, leading Kit to think he had shot him dead, and Nick later throwing him out onto the street as Kitty and Tom state their intent to get married.

Reception

Box office
The film was a failure at the box office.

Remake

A Playhouse 90 television version ten years later starring Jackie Gleason as Joe earned critical acclaim, with Jack Klugman as Nick, Dick York as Tom, Betsy Palmer as Kitty, and James Barton reprising his role as Kit Carson.

References

External links 
 

 
 
 
 

1948 films
1948 comedy-drama films
American black-and-white films
American comedy-drama films
1940s English-language films
American films based on plays
Films directed by H. C. Potter
Films scored by Carmen Dragon
Films set in San Francisco
United Artists films
1940s American films